James Ackah Cobbinah (born 22 September 1948) is a Ghanaian politician and a member of the first Parliament of the fourth Republic representing the Evalue Gwira constituency in the Western  Region of Ghana. He is a member of the National Democratic Congress.

Early life and education 
James Ackah Cobbinah  was born on 22 September 1948 at Evalue Gwira in the Western Region of Ghana. He attended the University of Ghana where he  obtained his Bachelor of Arts degree.

Politics 
He was first elected into Parliament on the Ticket of the National Democratic Congress for the  Evalue Gwira Constituency in the Western Region of Ghana during the 1992 Ghanaian General Elections. He was defeated by Kojo Armah of the Convention People's Party who polled 9,791 votes out of the 100% valid votes cast representing 38.60% against his opposition James Ackah Cobbinah of the National Democratic Congress who polled 7,694 votes representing 30.30%.

Career 
He is a teacher by profession and a former member of Parliament for the Evalue Gwira Constituency in the Western Region of Ghana.

Personal life 
He is a Christian.

References 

Living people
1948 births
National Democratic Congress (Ghana) politicians
University of Ghana alumni
Ghanaian educators
Ghanaian Christians
Ghanaian MPs 1993–1997
People from Western Region (Ghana)